Peat is an English patronymic surname. People with the name Peat include:

Andrus Peat (born 1993), American football player
Arthur Peat (1940–2012), English footballer
Charles Peat (1892–1979), British politician and cricketer
F. David Peat (1938–2017), British physicist and author
Harold R. Peat (1893–1960), Canadian soldier and author
Jeremy Peat (born 1945), British economist
Lindsay Peat (born 1980), Irish rugby union player
Louisa Watson Small Peat (1883–1952), Irish lecturer and writer
Marion Todd Peat (born 1964), former American football player
Mark Peat (born 1982), Scottish footballer
Michael Peat (born 1949), British accountant and former private secretary to Charles, Prince of Wales
Nathan Neil Martin Peat (born 1982), English footballer
Neville Peat, New Zealand author and photographer
Stephen Peat (born 1980), Canadian ice hockey player
Steve Peat (born 1974), English mountain biker
William Barclay Peat (1852–1936), British accountant

See also
Peet § Surname
Peete, surname
Pete (surname)